The Victorian Commission for Gambling Regulation (VCGR) was the gambling regulator in the Australian state of Victoria from 2004 until February 2012. The VCGR was part of the Victorian Department of Justice.

The VCGR regulated the four gambling operators who held a gambling licence in Victoria:

 Tabcorp Holdings Limited
 Tatts Group Limited
 Crown Casino
 Intralot

On 6 February 2012, the VCGR merged with Responsible Alcohol Victoria and formed the Victorian Commission for Gambling and Liquor Regulation (VCGLR). The VCGLR took on the roles and functions of the Victorian Commission for Gambling Regulation, the Director of Liquor Licensing and the Liquor Licensing Panel. The Commission had the power to undertake disciplinary actions and assumed the administrative and educative functions of Responsible Alcohol Victoria.

Gambling regulators
Former government agencies of Victoria (Australia)
Gambling in Australia
Government agencies established in 2004
Government agencies disestablished in 2012
2004 establishments in Australia
2012 disestablishments in Australia